The Roman Catholic Diocese of Ruhengeri is an ecclesiastical territory or diocese of the Roman Catholic Church in Rwanda. It was erected on 20 December 1960 by Pope John XXIII. The diocese is a suffragan of the Archdiocese of Kigali. The current bishop is Vincent Harolimana.

The diocese counts 11 parishes and covers the former Ruhengeri province in the current Musanze district. The diocese has been recovering from the war disaster since 1990–1998, and by the efforts by Bishop Bahujimihigo, it is moving towards a truly national ranking. The diocese owns one of the leading institution of higher learning (INES, Institut d'enseignement superieur de Ruhengeri) and a practical hospital (Hôpital de Nemba).

List of bishops of Ruhengeri
Bernard Manyurane (1960–1961)
Joseph Sibomana (1961–1969)
Phocas Nikwigize (1968–1996)
Kizito Bahujimihigo (1997–2007)
Vincent Harolimana (since 2012)

References

External links
Catholic-Hierarchy
GCatholic.org

Christian organizations established in 1960
Ruhengeri
Roman Catholic dioceses and prelatures established in the 20th century
1960 establishments in Ruanda-Urundi